Johan Gaarder (10 May 1893 – 14 July 1966) was a Norwegian footballer. He played in one match for the Norway national football team in 1922.

References

External links
 

1893 births
1966 deaths
Norwegian footballers
Norway international footballers
Association footballers not categorized by position